Haarlow is a surname. Notable people with the surname include:

 Bill Haarlow (1913–2003), American basketball player
 Rebecca Haarlow (born 1978), American television sports anchor

See also
 Harlow (disambiguation)